The Evangelical Church of the Augsburg Confession in Austria (Evangelische Kirche Augsburgischen Bekenntnisses in Österreich) is a Lutheran denomination in Austria. It is a member of the Lutheran World Federation, which it joined in 1947. It is also a member of the World Council of Churches, the Conference of European Churches and the Community of Protestant Churches in Europe as well as the Conference of Churches on the Rhine.

Structure
The Evangelical Church of the Augsburg Confession in Austria is headed by a Bishop – currently Michael Chalupka. The church consists of seven dioceses, each headed by a Superintendent. These superintendencies are broadly aligned territorially with the federal states of the Republic of Austria.

Social issues 
Since 2009, the Evangelical Church in Austria has been an advocate of gay rights and endorsed the introduction of civil partnerships for same-sex couples. Additionally, the church permits and supports blessing services for same-sex couples to celebrate their civil union.

References

External links 
 
Lutheran World Federation listing

Lutheran denominations
Lutheran World Federation members
Lutheranism in Austria